Kunak is the capital of the Kunak District in the Tawau Division of Sabah, Malaysia.

Kunak may also refer to:

Kunak District, administrative district in the Malaysian state of Sabah
Kunak (state constituency), state constituency in Sabah, Malaysia

See also 
Kunek (disambiguation)